In combustion, Clarke's equation is a third-order nonlinear partial differential equation, first derived by John Frederick Clarke in 1978. The equation describes the thermal explosion process, including both effects of constant-volume and constant-pressure processes, as well as the effects of adiabatic and isothermal sound speeds. The equation reads as

The term  describes the explosion at constant pressure and the term  describes the explosion at constant volume. Similarly, the term  describes the wave propagation at adiabatic sound speed and the term  describes the wave propagation at isothermal sound speed. Molecular transports are neglected in the derivation.

See also
Frank-Kamenetskii theory

References

Partial differential equations
Fluid dynamics
Combustion